First Army may refer to:

China
 New 1st Army, Republic of China
 First Field Army, a Communist Party of China unit in the Chinese Civil War
 1st Group Army, People's Republic of China

Germany
 1st Army (German Empire), a World War I field Army
 1st Army (Wehrmacht), a World War II field army
 1st Panzer Army
 1st Parachute Army (Wehrmacht)

Russia and the Soviet Union
 1st Army (Russian Empire)
 1st Red Banner Army
 1st Shock Army
 1st Guards Tank Army (Russia)

Others
 First Allied Airborne Army
 First Australian Army
 1st Army (Austria-Hungary)
 First Army (United Kingdom)
 First Army (Bulgaria)
 First Canadian Army
 1st Army (France)
 First Army (Greece)
 First Army (Hungary)
 First Army (Italy)
 First Army (Japan)
 First Army (Ottoman Empire)
 First Polish Army (1920)
 First Polish Army (1944–1945)
 First Army (Romania)
 First Army (Serbia)
 First Army (Turkey)
 First Army (United Arab Republic)
 First United States Army
 1st Army (Kingdom of Yugoslavia)

See also
 I Corps (disambiguation)
 1st Division (disambiguation)
 1st Brigade (disambiguation)
 1st Regiment (disambiguation)